Massey-Doby-Nisbet House is a historic home located near Van Wyck, Lancaster County, South Carolina. It was built about 1790, and was originally two stories with one room on each floor (an I-house type).  The house was enlarged and remodeled about 1830, which doubled the size and added Federal detailing. The house was remodeled again about 1935.

It was added to the National Register of Historic Places in 1990.

References

Houses on the National Register of Historic Places in South Carolina
Houses completed in 1790
Federal architecture in South Carolina
Houses in Lancaster County, South Carolina
National Register of Historic Places in Lancaster County, South Carolina